The 1928 Argentine Primera División was the 37th season of top-flight football in Argentina. The season began on April 15, 1928, and ended on June 30, 1929. The league expanded to include 36 teams, which played in a single league with each team playing the other only once.

Huracán won its 4th. title in Primera. El Porvenir and Argentino (B) returned to the top division after their runs on Segunda División while Liberal Argentino and Porteño were relegated.

Final table

References

Argentine Primera División seasons
1928 in Argentine football
1928 in South American football